Lycaena kasyapa, the green copper, is a small butterfly found in India that belongs to the lycaenids or blues family. The species was first described by Frederic Moore in 1865.

See also
List of butterflies of India
List of butterflies of India (Lycaenidae)

References
 
  
 
 
 
 

Lycaena
Butterflies of Asia
Butterflies described in 1865
Taxa named by Frederic Moore